Jessica Richie (born September 27, 1990) is a writer based in Durham, North Carolina.  Richie is currently the executive director of the Everything Happens Initiative at Duke University and the executive producer of the Everything Happens Podcast.

She is the co-author, with Kate Bowler, of the New York Times and USA Today best seller, Good Enough: 40ish Devotionals for a Life of Imperfection.

References 

Duke University people
21st-century American women writers
1990 births
Living people
Writers from Durham, North Carolina